Charles & Colvard, Ltd., is a Research Triangle Park, North Carolina-based publicly traded company that distributes and manufactures jewelry. It was founded in 1995 by Charles Eric Hunter under the name C3 Inc., and then run by his brother Jeff Hunter until 2000. The company changed its name to Charles & Colvard in 1999. The company employs 63 people full-time, and generated $32.4 million in revenue during the year ending June 30, 2019, up from $27.91 million in the previous year.

Charles & Covard was the first company to produce and sell synthetic moissanite, under U.S. patent US5723391 A, first filed by C3 Inc., North Carolina. The gemstones are made from silicon carbide crystals, supplied under an exclusive agreement from fellow North Carolina company Cree Inc. since 2014.

In June 2019 the company netted $10 million from a secondary public offering.

In March 2020, the company was notified that they were at risk of being delisted on NASDAQ, as their share price had been consistently below $1.

Don O'Connell was announced CEO in May 2020, taking over after Suzanne T. Miglucci's resignation. The announcement came days after reporting their quarterly earnings, which included a $5.3 million writeoff. O'Connell's base salary is $335,000, and Miglucci's was $278,000.

As part of the COVID-19 pandemic, the company received a $965,000 federally backed small business loan from Newtek Small Business Finance as part of the Paycheck Protection Program. WCNC highlighted the company, and publicly traded companies that received loans before privately held small businesses did. WCNC also noted some publicly traded companies had returned their loan amidst scrutiny. The company had furloughed about half of their employees on April 13, 2020. The company also has had a $5 million line of credit since 2018, which remains available.

Subsidiary companies and brands include 'Classic Moissanite', 'Forever Brilliant', 'Survivor Collection', 'Hearts & Arrows', 'Moissanite.com' and 'Lulu Avenue'.

References

Companies based in North Carolina
Companies established in 1995
Companies listed on the Nasdaq